А-300-538 is a project by Russian aviation company, JSC Alekseyev Central Hydrofoil Design Bureau, for a double decker ekranoplan with a maximum takeoff weight of 350 metric tons and a payload of 64 metric tons or 550 passengers over 3000 km.

References

Ekranoplans
Proposed aircraft of Russia